This article lists the main target shooting events and their results for 2014.

World Events

International Shooting Sport Federation

ISSF World Shooting Championships
 September 6-20: 2014 ISSF World Shooting Championships held in Granada, Spain.

ISSF World Cup
 2014 ISSF World Cup

World Shooting Para Sport Championships
 July 18-26: 2014 IPC Shooting World Championships held in Suhl, Germany

International Practical Shooting Confederation
 2014 IPSC Handgun World Shoot

FITASC
2014 Results

2014 Summer Youth Olympics
 August 17-22: Shooting at the 2014 Summer Youth Olympics, held in Nanjing, China

Commonwealth Games
 July 25-29: Shooting at the 2014 Commonwealth Games, Barry Buddon, Scotland

Regional Events

Africa

Americas

Central American & Caribbean Games
 November 15-24: Shooting at the 2014 Central American and Caribbean Games held in Veracruz, Mexico

Shooting Championships of the Americas
 2014 Shooting Championships of the Americas

South American Games
 Shooting at the 2014 South American Games held in Viña del Mar, Chile

Asia

Asian Shooting Championships
 March 7-13: 2014 Asian Airgun Championships
 November 1-10: 2014 Asian Shotgun Championships

Asian Games
 September 20-30: Shooting at the 2014 Asian Games

Europe

European Shooting Confederation
 February 26 - March 3: 2014 European 10 m Events Championships held in Moscow, Russia.
 June 16-27: 2014 European Shotgun Championships held in Sarlóspuszta, Hungary

"B Matches"
 February 6-8: InterShoot in Den Haag, Netherlands
 RIAC held in Strassen, Luxembourg

National Events

United Kingdom

NRA Imperial Meeting
 July, held at the National Shooting Centre, Bisley
 Queen's Prize winner: 
 Grand Aggregate winner: PG Kent
 Ashburton Shield winners: Wellington College
 Kolapore Winners: 
 National Trophy Winners: 
 Elcho Shield winners: 
 Vizianagram winners: House of Lords

NSRA National Meeting
 August, held at the National Shooting Centre, Bisley
 Earl Roberts British Prone Champion:

USA
 2014 NCAA Rifle Championships, won by West Virginia Mountaineers

References

 
2014 in sports